A-Nation (stylized as a-nation) is the name of an annual series of summer concerts that are held in various cities in Japan. Organized by Avex Group, Japan's biggest independent record label, this series features the most successful artists signed onto Avex Trax or other labels of the group (although some artists from other Japanese labels also participate here). A-Nation began in 2002 and is held each weekend during August of each year. Top Avex artists such as Ayumi Hamasaki, Kumi Koda, AAA, Ai Otsuka, BoA, Do As Infinity, TVXQ, Super Junior, Hitomi and SHINee perform at A-Nation every year.

Dates and venues

2002
 August 3 – Toyama Athletic Stadium
 August 4 – All-Season Resort Appi (now Appi Kogen Ski Resort)
 August 10 – Kure, Hiroshima
 August 11 – Huis Ten Bosch
 August 17 – Sportsland SUGO
 August 18 – Yamaha Resort Tsumagoi, Shizuoka
 August 24 and 25 – WTC Open Air Stadium, Osaka
 August 31 and September 1 – Odaiba, Tokyo

2003
 July 19 and 20 –  Kasai Rinkai Park, Tokyo
 July 26 – All-Season Resort Appi 
 August 2 and 3 – Uminonakamichi Seaside Park, Fukuoka
 August 9 and 10 – Port Messe Nagoya, Aichi
 August 16 and 17 – WTC Open Air Stadium
 August 23 – Hiroshima
 August 30 and 31 – Odaiba

2004
 July 31 – Toyama Athletic Stadium
 August 7 – Uminonakamichi Seaside Park
 August 14 – Port Messe Nagoya
 August 21 and 22 – Kobe Port Island
 August 28 and 29 – Showa Memorial Park

2005
 July 30 – Ōita Bank Dome
 August 6 – Makomanai Open Stadium, Hokkaido
 August 13 – Port Messe Nagoya
 August 20 and 21 – Ajinomoto Stadium
 August 27 and 28 – Kobe Port Island

2006
 July 29 – Echigo Hillside National Government Park, Niigata
 August 5 – Uminonakamichi Seaside Park
 August 12 – Port Messe Nagoya
 August 19 and 20 – Kobe Port Island
 August 26 and 27 – Ajinomoto Stadium

2007
 July 28 – Tohoku Electric Natori Sports Park, Miyagi
 August 4 – Ningineer Stadium
 August 12 – Yamaha Resort Tsumagoi
 August 18 and 19 – Kobe Port Island
 August 25 and 26 – Ajinomoto Stadium

2008
 July 26 – Ningineer Stadium
 August 2 – Miyazaki Athletic Stadium
 August 10 – Ishikawa Kanazawa Stadium
 August 17 – Port Messe Nagoya
 August 23 and 24 – Sakai City Green Park, Osaka
 August 30 and 31 – Ajinomoto Stadium

2009
 August 1 – Kanto Repark, Kumamoto
 August 8 – Ningineer Stadium
 August 15 – Port Messe Nagoya
 August 22 and 23 – Ajinomoto Stadium
 August 29 and 30 – Nagai Stadium (now Yanmar Stadium Nagai)

2010
 August 7 – Ningineer Stadium
 August 14 – Port Messe Nagoya
 August 21 and 22 – Nagai Stadium
 August 28 and 29 – Ajinomoto Stadium

2011
 July 30 – Ningineer Stadium
 August 6 – Uminonakamichi Seaside Park
 August 13 – Port Messe Nagoya
 August 20 and 21 – Nagai Stadium
 August 27 and 28 – Ajinomoto Stadium

2012
 Music Week (August 3 to 12) – Yoyogi National Gymnasium, Shibuya-AX, Shibuya WWW, Shibuya Public Hall
 Stadium Fes 
 August 18 and 19 – Nagai Stadium
 August 25 and 26 – Ajinomoto Stadium

2013
 A-Nation Island: August 3 to 11 – Yoyogi National Gymnasium
 Stadium Fes 
 August 24 and 25 – Nagai Stadium
 August 31 and September 1 – Ajinomoto Stadium

2014
 A-Nation Island: August 14 to 20 – Yoyogi National Gymnasium
 Stadium Fes: August 29 to 31 – Ajinomoto Stadium
 A-Nation Taiwan: September 13 – Nangang 101 Cultural Creation Hall
 A-Nation Singapore: October 18 – MasterCard Theatres

2015
 A-Nation Island: July 31 to August 6 – Yoyogi National Gymnasium
 Stadium Fes
 August 22 and 23 – Nagai Stadium
 August 29 and 30 – Ajinomoto Stadium

2016
 A-Nation Island: July 29 to August 4 – Yoyogi National Gymnasium
 Stadium Fes: August 27 and 28 – Ajinomoto Stadium

2017
 August 26 and 27 – Ajinomoto Stadium

2018
 July 28 – Nagashima Spa Land (canceled due to Typhoon Jongdari)
 August 4 – Huis Ten Bosch
 August 18 and 19 – Yanmar Stadium Nagai
 August 25 and 26 – Ajinomoto Stadium

2020
 August 29 - Online (YouTube, LINE, Beyond LIVE)

Participant artists
Artists not signed with Avex Group are expressed in italics.

{|class="wikitable"
|-
!2018 Stadium festival Ajinomoto!!2020 (Blue Stage)(Beyond LIVE)!!2020 (Green Stage)(Beyond LIVE)!!2020 (Yellow Stage)(Beyond LIVE)!!2020 (Purple Stage)(YouTube LIVE)
|- valign="top"
|
August 25
 TVXQ (HL headliner)
 NCT 127
 M-Flo
 CHEMISTRY
 Da-iCE
 超特急 (former Bullet Train (band) )
 BiSH
 BoA

August 26
 浜崎あゆみ Ayumi Hamasaki HL
 EXO
 倖田來未 Koda Kumi
 Da-iCE
 TRF (band)
 Dream Ami Ami (singer)
 三浦大知 Daichi Miura
 Red Velvet
||
 大塚 紗英 Sae Ōtsuka
 GENIC
 豆柴の大群 MAMESHiBA NO TAiGUN
 エンパイア EMPiRE
 フェイキー FAKY
 VOGUE5
 ノーベルブライト Novelbright
 Naomi
 広瀬 香美 Kohmi Hirose
 Kalen Anzai
 Amuyi
 倖田 來未 Koda Kumi
 GEmma
 Fei
 SuperM
 浜崎あゆみ Ayumi Hamasaki||
 BuZZ
 Hao
 三浦 大知 Miura Daichi
 BACK-ON
 Ballistik Boyz from Exile Tribe
 I Don't Like Mondays.
 Jade
 ダイス DA-iCE
 エルオーエル lol
 ダパンプ Da Pump
 Wayne Huang
 STAMP
 日高 光啓 Sky-Hi
 Julius
 Super Junior
||
 Peter Fish & Yoanna
 ビバリー Beverly
 ピコ太郎 PikoTaro
 Genin Wa Jibun Ni Aru
 James Lu
 M!LK
 超ときめき♡宣伝部 Chō Tokimeki♡Sendenbu
 Red Velvet Timo Feng
 HARAMIchan
 EXO-SC シーモ Seamo
 TRF
||
 Mosawo
 梨里杏 riria
 Taisei Miyakawa
 ノーベルブライト Novelbright
 macaroniempitsu
 Han-Kun (Shōnan no Kaze)
 アイナ・ジ・エンド Aina the End
 ゴールデンボンバー Golden Bomber
|}

1These artists are managed by Avex Group, but are not signed to any of its labels.
2These artists left Avex Group either after being terminated or end of their contracts.
3These artists, before being signed to Avex Group, were invited to participate to A-Nation.
4Mari Natsuki is currently signed to another label, while her band, Gubier du Mari, is under Avex.
5Minami Kuribayashi is currently and originally signed to Lantis. She is also currently signed to Avex Group for Muv-Luv Alternative: Total Eclipse.

Sponsors

Main
 7&i (2010–present)
 FamilyMart (2009)
 Morinaga & Company (Weider in Jelly) (2005–present)
 Nippon Life (You May Dream! Project) Toyota (2004)

Yearly

2012
 Audi
 Brother Industries (Joysound) Hankyu Travel
 Itochu (Head Japan) Kenkou Corporation, Inc. (Estenad) Ray-Ban
 Sony Mobile Communications (Xperia)2013
 Brother Industries (Joysound) ET Square Inc. (Music Chef) Itochu (Head Japan)''
 Mercedes-Benz
 Sankyo Group 
 Shiseido
 Teijin Group

2018
 7-Eleven
 dTV!
 OUTDOOR PRODUCTS
 Music On! TV
 Sky PerfecTV!
 LIVE DAM STADIUM
 Teijin Group
 KFC
 Japan Tabasco Inc.
 TikTok
 Doutor Coffee
 Nissei Advance Inc.
 Jutakujohokan Inc.

Media partners
 Fuji TV (2012–present)

References

External links
  

Avex Group
Music festivals in Japan
2002 establishments in Japan
Music festivals established in 2002
Summer events in Japan